This article list the results of women's singles category in the 2007 BWF World Championships (World Badminton Championships).

Seeds 

  Zhang Ning (semi-finals)
  Xie Xingfang (third round)
  Huaiwen Xu (quarter-finals)
  Pi Hongyan (quarter-finals)
  Zhu Lin (world champion)
  Wang Chen (final)
  Lu Lan (semi-finals)
  Yao Jie (second round)

  Petya Nedelcheva (third round)
  Wong Mew Choo (quarter-finals)
  Yip Pui Yin (third round)
  Tine Rasmussen (third round)
  Juliane Schenk (second round)
  Kaori Mori (third round)
  Maria Kristin Yulianti (third round)
  Tracey Hallam (quarter-finals)

Draw

Finals

Top half

Section 1

Section 2

Bottom half

Section 3

Section 4

Sources 
Tournamentsoftware.com: 2007 World Championships - Women's singles

- Women's singles, 2007 Bwf World Championships
BWF
2007 in Malaysian women's sport